Norman Lewis is the name of:

Norman Lewis (author) (1908–2003), British writer
Norman Lewis (grammarian) (1912–2006), American author
Norman Lewis (artist) (1909–1979), African-American painter, scholar, and teacher
Norman Lewis (fencer) (1915–2006), American Olympic fencer
Norman Lewis (footballer) (1908–1972), English footballer
Norman Lewis (boxer) (1923–1981), Welsh boxer on the list of Welsh boxing champions 
Norman Lewis (tennis) British tennis player of the 1940s and 1950s, see list of Great Britain Davis Cup team representatives
Norman Lewis del Alcázar, member of the Peruvian Congress 2011-2016

See also 
Norm Lewis